is a town located in Tochigi Prefecture, Japan. ,  the town had an estimated population of 25,050 in 10,153 households, and a population density of 830 persons per km².

Geography
Nogi is located in the flatlands in the far southeast corner of Tochigi Prefecture.

Surrounding municipalities
Tochigi Prefecture
 Oyama
 Tochigi
Ibaraki Prefecture
 Koga

Climate
Nogi has a Humid continental climate (Köppen Cfa) characterized by warm summers and cold winters with heavy snowfall.  The average annual temperature in Nogi is 14.3 °C. The average annual rainfall is 1317 mm with September as the wettest month. The temperatures are highest on average in August, at around 26.4 °C, and lowest in January, at around 3.1 °C.

Demographics
Per Japanese census data, the population of Nogi has recently plateaued after a long period of growth.

History
During the Edo period, Nogi-shuku was a post station on the Nikkō Kaidō highway connecting Edo with the shrines at Nikkō,  located within Koga Domain. After the Meiji restoration, the area of Nogi was initially part of Ibaraki Prefecture, but was transferred to Tochigi Prefecture on November 14, 1871. Nogi village were created within Shimotsuga District on April 1, 1889 with the creation of the modern municipalities system. It was elevated to town status on January 1, 1965.

Government
Nasu has a mayor-council form of government with a directly elected mayor and a unicameral town council of 14 members. Nogi, together with the city of Oyama collectively contributes five members to the Tochigi Prefectural Assembly. In terms of national politics, the town is part of Tochigi 4th district of the lower house of the Diet of Japan.

Economy
The economy of Nogi is heavily dependent on agriculture; however, it is increasing becoming a commuter town due to its proximity to several metropolitan areas and is regarded as belonging to the Greater Kanto metropolitan area. The commuting rate is 18.8% to Koga, 13.1% for Tokyo metropolis, and 12.4% for Oyama per the 2010 national census. There are also several industrial parks in Nogi.

Education
Nogi has five public primary schools and two public middle schools operated by the town government. The town does not have a high school.

Transportation

Railway
 JR East –  Tohoku Main Line (Utsunomiya Line)

Highway

Local attractions
former Shimotsuke brickworks Hoffman kiln (national Important Cultural Property)
Nogi Jinja

Noted people from Nogi
Wakana Sakai, actress, writer and gravure idol

References

External links

Official Website 

Towns in Tochigi Prefecture
Nogi, Tochigi